The American Historical Collection (AHC), established in 1950, is an archive of American involvement in the Philippines. The AHC is one of the largest, most diverse and most complete collection of materials of this kind in the world boasting some 13,518 books, 18,674 photographs, and other various materials.

The AHC is the primary resource in Manila for official documents and reports from 1898 to 1946, such as the Reports of the US-Philippine Commission (1900-1915), Reports of the Governors-General of the Philippine Islands (1916-1935), Reports of the High Commissioner, the Executive Orders and Proclamations (1901-1933), Reports of the War Department and of the Secretary of War (1898-1924), and other insular government reports.

Equally valuable to the researcher or historian, are the thousands of miscellaneous documents – pamphlets, reports, articles, and other items that had been collected – as well as the AHC’s unparalleled files of photographs. These go back to before the US era and include photos of Filipino notables as well as US officials and prominent members of the Manila community in the US era.

History

In 1950, US Ambassador Myron Cowen, who saw the devastation wrought by the Second World War on many things, including the memory of the times preceding it, encouraged the American community to donate books and other materials pertaining to the first half of the 20th century. His initiative was responsible for the early phase of the collection.

While it could easily have come under Embassy jurisdiction, Ambassador Cowen wanted the library to have a more permanent and local organization, "as ambassadors come and go".

It was decided to devolve the library’s maintenance and finances upon the American Association of the Philippines (AAP) Historical Committee to take on the responsibility of overseeing the new library. The Committee had an equal number of members appointed by the ambassador and by the AAP.  

Acquisitions, donations, and funds were administered by the American Historical Committee.  

The AHC was first housed at the U.S. Embassy, then above the Thomas Jefferson Cultural Center in Makati. In 1990, a crisis in the life of the collection was overcome with providential help from the U.S. Library of Congress, which needing space for its own collections, provided financial support for the housing and operation of the library. This assistance continued through 1995, at which time U.S. government support for the AHC was terminated.

With the withdrawal of this support, the American Historical Collection Foundation (AHCF) was created to subsume the American Historical Committee for the purpose of overseeing the collection and raising funds for its continuation. Under a 1995 directive of then U.S. Ambassador John Negroponte, the AHCF inherited the responsibilities of the American Historical Committee.

In 1995, through an agreement by and between the AAP and the Ateneo de Manila University, the collection is assured of a permanent life in the intellectual heart of the nation that the Americans helped to create — at the Rizal Library of the Ateneo. The Rizal Library is committed to preserve the collection, following the high standards it uses when conserving its own holdings. Furthermore, it is committed to facilitate the research of scholars.

Principal holdings
 The Spanish–American War, the American Occupation and Philippine–American War, including the reports of the Schurman Commission and Taft Commission, the First and Second Philippine Commission respectively
 The annual reports of the Philippine Commission and the Insular Government
 Biographical materials on Americans in military and civilian life
 Journalists' reports and books on the Philippines, 1898–1934
 Reports and records of the Philippine Assembly and Philippine Senate, 1907–1934
 Reports of U.S. official commissions, such as the 1924 Monroe Report on Education
 Periodicals, such as the American Chamber of Commerce Journal (1921–1993), Philippine Magazine (1925–1941), Philippine Review (1916–1953), Far Eastern Economic Review (1904–1910).
 Complete records of World War II and the internment of allied citizens (U.S., British, Dutch, etc.) at Los Baños and Santo Tomas.

References

External links
 American Historical Collection Website

Libraries in Metro Manila
Archives in the Philippines